Argo is a ghost town in Fannin County, in the U.S. state of Georgia.

History
Prior to European colonization, the area that is now Argo was inhabited by the Cherokee people and other Indigenous peoples for thousands of years.

A post office called Argo was established in 1900, and remained in operation until 1908. In 1900, the community had 42 inhabitants.

References

Landforms of Fannin County, Georgia